"Erobict, sierobict" is a song recorded in 1983 by Austrian singer Rainhard Fendrich. It reached #9 in the Austrian charts.

1983 singles
Rainhard Fendrich songs
1983 songs